Carol Ann Campbell (died November 19, 2008) was the Democratic Councilwoman representing Philadelphia's Fourth City Council District. Campbell was narrowly defeated for renomination by Curtis J. Jones, Jr. on May 15, 2007.

She is the daughter of former councilman Edgar Campbell. She was under investigation by the Pennsylvania Attorney General for corruption charges prior to her death in November 2008.

Campbell was Secretary of the Democratic City Committee and Chair of the Alliance of Black Ward Leaders.

References

Year of birth uncertain
2008 deaths
Philadelphia City Council members
Pennsylvania Democrats
Women city councillors in Pennsylvania
African-American city council members in Pennsylvania
African-American women in politics
21st-century African-American people
21st-century African-American women